The ATP Challenger Series is the second tier tour for professional tennis organised by the Association of Tennis Professionals (ATP). The 2001 ATP Challenger Series calendar comprised 135 tournaments, with prize money ranging from $25,000 up to $125,000.

Schedule

January

February

March

April

May

June

July

August

September

October

November

December

References 

2001 in tennis
ATP Challenger Tour